Sinecio León Gavilán (born 20 May 1983 in Hernandarias, Paraguay) is a Paraguayan footballer currently playing for 12 de Octubre of the Division Intermedia in Paraguay.

Career
León began his career with Sportivo Luqueño spending time with the club's reserves and first team.

Teams
  Sportivo Luqueño 2004–2006
  Martín Ledesma 2007
  Sportivo Luqueño 2007–2008
  3 de Febrero 2008–2009
  Deportivo Merlo 2009–2010
  Sportivo Trinidense 2010
  12 de Octubre 2011–present

References

 
 

1983 births
Living people
Paraguayan footballers
Paraguayan expatriate footballers
12 de Octubre Football Club players
Sportivo Trinidense footballers
Sportivo Luqueño players
Deportivo Merlo footballers
Expatriate footballers in Argentina
Association football midfielders